is a 1997 Japanese film. It was written and directed by Kazuyoshi Kumakiri.

Story
In the year 1972 a small group of left-wing students are living at a dingy Tokyo apartment in the mountain village of Karuizawa in Nagano-ken, Japan. While the group leader, Aizawa, waits to be released from prison his promiscuous girlfriend, Masami, is left in charge. While waiting for Aizawa's release, Masami uses her overt sexuality and engages in promiscuity with the fellow students. As the days pass by things take a tragic turn. Within a few days of his release the group's leader commits hara-kiri. After learning of Aizawa's suicide, the shotgun- toting Masami loses control and the group quickly falls into self-destruction as sex, distrust, paranoia, and violence overtakes them.

Cast
Sumiko Mikami
Shigeru Bokuda
Shunsuke Sawada
Toshiyuki Sugihara

Production

References

External links

 Giuseppe Sedia (October 2006), Interview with Kumakiri Kazuyoshi (Italian) at Asia Express.

1997 films
1990s Japanese-language films
Films directed by Kazuyoshi Kumakiri
Japanese horror drama films
Japanese psychological horror films
Psychological drama films
1997 drama films
Japanese splatter films
1997 horror films
1990s Japanese films